Slew o' Gold (April 19, 1980 – October 14, 2007) was an American thoroughbred racehorse who was voted the 1983 Eclipse Award for Outstanding Three-Year-Old Male Horse and the 1984 Eclipse Award for Outstanding Older Male Horse.

Background
Bred by Kentucky's renowned Claiborne Farm, he was owned and raced by Equusequity Stable, a partnership of Dr. Jim and Sally Hill and Mickey and Karen Taylor, who owned Oak Crest Farm in Marion County, Florida. Slew o' Gold was a half brother to the stakes winning Coastal.

Racing career
As a 2-year-old, Slew o' Gold ran in only three races, winning two. In the 1983 American Triple Crown races, Slew o' Gold finished 4th in the Kentucky Derby, did not run in the Preakness Stakes, and finished second in the Belmont Stakes. In the fall of 1983, Slew o' Gold blossomed as a top race horse by defeating top older horses in the Woodward Stakes and the Jockey Club Gold Cup, while finishing a close second in the Marlboro Cup, narrowly missing a sweep of the 1983 Fall Championship Series at Belmont.

Racing as a 4-year-old in 1984, Slew o' Gold did not make his first start until July 2 due to problems with his hooves, but won four major races, including the Whitney Handicap at Saratoga and a sweep of the 1984 Fall Championship Series or Fall Triple Crown - the Marlboro Cup, Woodward Stakes and Jockey Club Gold Cup (mile and a half) at Belmont Park that earned him a $1,000,000 bonus.  In his final start of 1984 and of his career, which was the first running of the Breeders' Cup Classic, the race produced an exciting finish between 30–1 longshot Wild Again on the inside, Gate Dancer on the outside and favorite Slew o' Gold in between. The three battled down the stretch with Wild Again bearing out and shifting his path away from the rail and Gate Dancer "lugging in" towards the rail, squeezing out Slew O' Gold. Wild Again finished a head in front of Gate Dancer with Slew o' Gold less than a length behind. After a 10-minute stewards' inquiry and controversial decision, Wild Again was left in first place but Gate Dancer was disqualified to third, and Slew o' Gold placed second.

Stud record
After the Breeders' Cup, Slew o' Gold was retired to stand at stud at Three Chimneys Farm near Midway, Kentucky. He sired the Grade I winners Awe Inspiring, Golden Opinion, Dramatic Gold, Gorgeous, Thirty Six Red and Tactile, along with stakes winner Nine Carat, who won the 1991 Prix Montenica, a Listed race at Deauville-La Touques Racecourse in France. After 17 years in stud service, in 2002 Slew o' Gold was pensioned.

Honors
In 1992, Slew o' Gold was inducted into the National Museum of Racing and Hall of Fame. In The Blood-Horse magazine ranking of the top 100 U.S. thoroughbred champions of the 20th Century, Slew o' Gold was ranked #58.

Death
Slew o' Gold was euthanized due to the infirmities of old age on October 14, 2007, at the age of 27. He is buried at Three Chimneys Farm.

Pedigree

External links
 Video of Slew o' Gold's 1984 Jockey Club Gold Cup

References

 slewogold.com

1980 racehorse births
2007 racehorse deaths
Eclipse Award winners
Racehorses bred in Kentucky
Racehorses trained in the United States
Thoroughbred family 9-f
United States Thoroughbred Racing Hall of Fame inductees